Staraya Kara (İśke Qara) is a rural locality (a village) in Kazanchinsky Selsoviet, Askinsky District, Bashkortostan, Russia. The population was 39 as of 2010. There is 1 street.

Geography 
Staraya Kara is located 43 km west of Askino (the district's administrative centre) by road. Novaya Kara is the nearest rural locality.

References 

Rural localities in Askinsky District